Scholastica ( – 10 February AD 543) is a saint of the Catholic Church, the Eastern Orthodox Churches and the Anglican Communion. She was born in Italy, and a ninth-century tradition makes her the twin sister of Saint Benedict of Nursia. Her feast day is 10 February, Saint Scholastica's Day. Scholastica is traditionally regarded as the founder of the Benedictine nuns.

Life 
According to the late 6th century Dialogues of Gregory the Great, Scholastica was born c. 480 in Nursia, Umbria, of wealthy parents (Anicius Eupropius and his wife Claudia Abondantia Reguardati). While Gregory states that Scholastica was Benedict's sister, a later tradition says she was his twin (whether this is meant biologically or spiritually, or both is unclear). Gregory also says she was dedicated to God from a young age. She and her brother Benedict were brought up together until the time he left to pursue studies in Rome. 

A young Roman woman of Scholastica's class and time would likely have remained in her father's house until marriage (likely arranged) or entry into consecrated life. On occasion several consecrated virgins would live together in a household and form a community.

Benedictine tradition holds that Scholastica established a hermitage about five miles from Monte Cassino and that this was the first convent of Benedictine nuns. However, it is possible that Scholastica lived in a hermitage with one or two other consecrated virgins in a cluster of houses at the base of Mount Cassino where there is an ancient church under her patronage Monastero di Santa Scolastica. Ruth Clifford Engs notes that since Dialogues indicates that Scholastica was dedicated to God at an early age, perhaps she lived in her father's house with other religious women until his death and then moved nearer to Benedict.

Narrative from the Dialogues 

The most commonly told story about her is that Scholastica would, once a year, go and visit her brother at a place near his abbey, and they would spend the day worshiping together and discussing sacred texts and issues.

One day they had supper and continued their conversation. When Benedict indicated it was time for him to leave, Scholastica, perhaps sensing that the time of her death was drawing near, asked him to stay with her for the evening so they could continue their discussions. Not wishing to break his own Rule, Benedict refused, insisting that he needed to return to his cell. At that point, Scholastica closed her hands in prayer, and after a moment, a wild storm started outside of the guest house in which they were staying. Benedict asked, "What have you done?", to which she replied, "I asked you and you would not listen; so I asked my God and he did listen. So now go off, if you can; leave me and return to your monastery." Benedict was unable to return to his monastery, and they spent the night in discussion.

Three days later, from his cell, he saw his sister's soul leaving the earth and ascending to heaven in the form of a shining white dove. Benedict had her body brought to his monastery, where he had it laid in the tomb which he had prepared for himself.

The Anglo-Saxon bishop and scholar Aldhelm recounts the story in both the De Laude Virginitatis, written for the nuns at Barking, and in the shorter Carmen de virginitate.

Studies 
What is known of Scholastica derives from the Dialogues of Gregory the Great. Early calendars and place names in the area around Monte Cassino support the historical accuracy of St. Gregory the Great's account of her life. Gregory names as his sources four of Benedict's contemporaries. A contemporary, Caesarius of Arles, wrote the Regula virginum (Rule for Virgins), a rule drawn up for virgins living in community, for a community which was headed by his sister, Caesaria.

Veneration 
Scholastica is the patron saint of Benedictine nuns, education, and convulsive children, and is invoked against storms and rain. 
Her feast is celebrated on 10 February.  Saint Scholastica's Day bears special importance in the Benedictine monastic calendar. 

In iconography, Scholastica is represented in a Benedictine habit, often as an abbess, and holding the Rule of Saint Benedict, with a crucifix or an ascending dove.

Scholastica was selected as the main motif for a high value commemorative coin: the Austria €50 'The Christian Religious Orders', issued 13 March 2002. On the obverse (heads) side of the coin Scholastica is depicted alongside Benedict. 

Scholastica is honored on the calendars of the Church of England and the Episcopal Church on 10 February. The calendar of the Diocese of Aachen has an additional feast of the translation of Scholastica's relics on 6 February, the Premonstratensians commemorate her on 9 February.

See also 
 List of Catholic saints
 St Scholastica Day riot
 Saint Scholastica, patron saint archive

References

External links 

 Whatley, E. Gordon, Thompson, Anne B., and Upchurch, Robert K. "The Life of St. Scholastica:Introduction", Saints Lives in Middle English Collections, Medieval Institute Publications, Kalamazoo, Michigan, 2004
 Adrienne von Speyr, ″Book of All Saints: Scholastica″, pp. 347–349. San Francisco: Ignatius Press, 2008.
 Butler, Alban. "St. Scholastica", The Lives or the Fathers, Martyrs and Other Principal Saints, Vol.I, D. & J. Sadlier, & Company, 1864
 Foley O.F.M., Leonard, "Saint Scholastica", Saint of the Day, Franciscan Media

480 births
543 deaths
Year of birth uncertain
People from Norcia

Benedictine abbesses
Benedictine spirituality
Benedictine saints
6th-century Italian nuns
Italian Roman Catholic saints
Founders of Catholic religious communities
Italian twins
5th-century Italo-Roman people
6th-century Italo-Roman people
5th-century Christian saints
6th-century Christian saints
Christian female saints of the Middle Ages
Anglican saints
Consecrated virgins